Hypocrita plagifera is a moth of the family Erebidae. It was described by Cajetan and Rudolf Felder in 1862. It is found in Brazil.

References

 Arctiidae genus list at Butterflies and Moths of the World of the Natural History Museum

Hypocrita
Moths described in 1862